Kaipkulovo (Qäyepqol) is a rural locality (a village) in Novobayramgulovsky Selsoviet, Uchalinsky District, Bashkortostan, Russia. The population was 107 as of 2010. There are 4 streets.

Geography 
Kaipkulovo is located 50 km southwest of Uchaly (the district's administrative centre) by road. Novobayramgulovo is the nearest rural locality.

References 

Rural localities in Uchalinsky District